Syed Waliullah (August 15, 1922 – October 10, 1971) was a Bangladeshi novelist, short-story writer and playwright. He was notable for his debut novel, Lalsalu (translated in English with the title "Tree Without Roots"). He was awarded Bangla Academy Literary Award (1961), Adamjee Prize (1965), Ekushey Padak (1984) and Bangladesh National Film for Best Story (2001).

Early life and education
Waliullah was born on 15 August 1922 at Sholashahar in Chittagong District to Nasim Ara Khatun and Syed Ahmadullah. His mother died when he was twelve. He has an elder brother, Syed Nasrullah. His father, Syed Ahmadullah, was a government officer. He was a district magistrate of British Raj period. Waliullah spent his childhood in Mymensingh, Feni, Krishnanagar and Kurigram. His notable novel, Lalsalu, was inspired by a shrine covered with red cloth that he would often pass when he lived in Mymensingh.

Waliullah passed his matriculation examination in 1939 from Kurigram High School. He completed his IA from Dhaka Intermediate College in 1941and bachelor's from Ananda Mohan College in Mymensingh in 1943. He then moved to Calcutta to complete his master's in economics. But he couldn't complete his master's due to untimely demise of his father. He joined The Statesman newspaper and worked until 1947.

Career
In 1947, Waliullah moved from Calcutta to Dhaka. He joined Radio Pakistan. In 1950, he was transferred to Karachi.  In 1951, he started serving as the press attaché at the Pakistan missions in New Delhi, Sydney, Jakarta and London. In 1960, he was appointed as the First Secretary at the Pakistan embassy in Paris. In 1967, he joined the UNESCO in Paris.

Literature
Waliullah is often considered the pioneer of existential analysis of the characters psyche in the literature of Bangladesh. The last two of his three novels, especially ' Kando Nadi Kando (Cry, o river), (কাঁদো নদী কাঁদো) (1968), show his mastery in revealing the inner depths of his characters. Chander Amaboshay (Dark moon) (চাঁদের অমাবস্যা ), (1964) was another famous novel of him. Nayanchara (নয়নচারা), (1946) and Dui Tir O Anyanya Galpa (দুই তীর এবং অন্যান্য গল্প), (1965) are storybooks written by him.

Lalsalu

Lalsalu tells the story of Majid, a poor man from a misguided Muslim background. Majid comes to a remote village. He declares an old grave to be the Mazar that of a Pir, covers it with the traditional red cloth used for mausoleums, and establishes his stronghold on the life of the people using the reflected power on him of the supposed saint. The novel shows his struggle with other religious figures trying to establish dominance, the undercurrent of pagan ideas among the people, and his own weaknesses.

The novel was adapted to a Tanvir Mokammel film with the same title in 2001.

Personal life and death
Waliullah met Anne Marie Thibaud (1929–1997), a French woman, in Sydney. They were married in 1955 and had two children, Simine and Iraj. He was a cousin of Jamal Nazrul Islam, a physicist and mathematician.

Waliullah died in Meudon in Paris on October 10, 1971.

Works
Novels
 Lalsalu (Tree without roots), 1948
 Chander Amaboshay (Dark moon), 1963
 Kando Nadi Kando (Cry, o river), 1966
 The Ugly Asian, 1959

Dramas
 Bahipir (1955)
 Tarangabhanga (1964)
 Sudanga (1964)

Short story collection
 Nayanchara (1945)
 Dui Teer O Anyanya Galpa (1965)

References 

1922 births
1971 deaths
Pakistani writers
Pakistani expatriates in India
Pakistani expatriates in Australia
Pakistani expatriates in Indonesia
Pakistani expatriates in the United Kingdom
Pakistani expatriates in France
Bengali-language writers
Bengali novelists
Bangladeshi male novelists
20th-century novelists
University of Calcutta alumni
Recipients of Bangla Academy Award
Recipients of the Ekushey Padak
Best Story National Film Award (Bangladesh) winners
People from Chittagong District
20th-century Bangladeshi male writers
Dhaka College alumni
20th-century screenwriters
Magic realism writers
Ananda Mohan College alumni